Krmpote is a group of villages in Croatia located around Novi Vinodolski in Croatian Littoral, and to the area belong villages Bile, Drinak, Jakovo Polje (Sv. Jakov), Javorje, Klenovica–Žrnovnica, Krmpotske Vodice, Luka Krmpotska, Podmelnik, Povile, Ruševo Krmpotsko, Sibinj Krmpotski, Smokvica Krmpotska, and Zabukovac. It is related to local population of Bunjevci and etymologically deriving from their tribe named Krmpoćani (Carimpoti; Krnpote and Krmpote) who arrived from temporary village area of Krmpota (Carampotti) near Zemunik (today between Medviđe and Zelengrad), in North Dalmatia (Bukovica) in the beginning of the 17th century. From it derives the related surname Krmpotić, as well same-titled noble family Kermpotich who lived in Buhovo in West Herzegovina from where emigrated to North Dalmatia in the mid-15th century because of Ottoman invasion. In Herzegovina the surname became extinct, and there's uncertainty as to which families directly descend from them, besides Zdunić, Sabljić, Cvitanovć/Cvitković among many others. Croatian linguist Petar Šimunović considered it a Vlach oeconym, and linguist Valentin Putanec etymologically derived it from Latin root camp(us) (> *Compates) "those who live in the field" with rotation kamp > crmp (as in Romanian căpusa > krpuša) with ethnic suffix -ota, as in Vlahota (Vlach), Krmpota (Krmpoćanin), Likota (Ličanin).

References

Populated places in Primorje-Gorski Kotar County